The Battle of Dimdim is the name for the battle between the Safavid Empire and the Sunni Kurds of the Ottoman Empire between 1609 and 1610.

The battle
There are well documented historical accounts of a long battle from 1609 to 1610 between Kurds and the Safavid Empire. The Kurds were at a disadvantage numerically and technologically. After a siege lasting almost a year, the Safavid Grand Vizier Hatem Beg captured the fort and massacred the Kurdish garrison.

Aftermath
After a long and bloody siege led by the Safavid grand vizier Hatem Beg, which lasted from November 1609 to the summer of 1610, Dimdim was captured. All the defenders were killed. Shah Abbas I ordered a general massacre in Bradost and Mukriyan (reported by Iskandar Beg Turkoman, Safavid Historian in the Book  Alam Aray-e Abbasi) and resettled the Afshar tribe in the region while deporting many Kurdish tribes to Khorasan region. Although Safavid historians (like Iskandar Beg ) depicted the first battle of Dimdim as a result of Kurdish mutiny or treason, in Kurdish oral traditions (Beytî Dimdim), literary works (Dzhalilov, pp. 67–72), and histories, it was treated as a struggle of the Kurdish people against foreign domination. In fact, Beytî Dimdim is considered a national epic second only to Mem û Zîn by Ahmad Khani. The first literary account of this battle is written by Faqi Tayran.

See also
 Bradost
 History of the Kurdish people
 Iranian Kurdistan
 Kurdish people
 Safavid Empire
 Timeline of Kurdish uprisings

References and notes

External links
 Battle of DimDim, Encyclopaedia Iranica
 History of Shah Abbas the Great: Tarik-E Alamara-Ye Abbasi

 
Conflicts in 1609
Conflicts in 1610
DimDim
Ottoman–Persian Wars
History of West Azerbaijan Province
1609 in Asia
1610 in Asia
1610 in the Ottoman Empire
1609 in the Ottoman Empire
Kurdish rebellions in the Ottoman Empire